Kesho Yvonne Scott (born 1953) is associate professor of American Studies and Sociology at Grinnell College. Scott received her M.A. in political sociology at the University of Detroit and received her Ph.D. in American Studies from the University of Iowa in 1988. After receiving her doctoral degree she became Distinguished American Studies Scholar in Residence at Pennsylvania State University in Harrisburg (1989), visiting professor at Nanjing University in China (1994), and Fulbright visiting professor at Addis Ababa University in Ethiopia (2001–2002). Scott's interests include black women in America, multiculturalism, and unlearning racism.

She is the first African-American woman to receive tenure at Grinnell.

Early life and career 
Scott was born in Detroit and received her BA from Wayne State University. Scott has served as a faculty member for Semester at Sea  (Spring 1991, Fall 2008, and Spring 2015) and has been a trainer and consultant for the program. Scott has appeared on The Oprah Winfrey Show, the Sonya Live show, the Last Call show, and on TBS's Family of Women show hosted by Jane Fonda.

On January 21, 2017, Scott spoke at the Women's March in Des Moines, Iowa.

Awards 
 Iowa Woman of the Year (1986).  
 American Book Award (1988) for Tight Spaces 
 Cristine Wilson Medal for Equality and Justice (2008) 
 Iowa African-American Hall of Fame Inductee (2016)

Bibliography
The Habit of Surviving: Black Women's Strategies for Life (1991)
Tight Spaces (1987, reissued 1999)

References

External links
Homepage at Grinnell
CHAMPION FOR SOCIAL JUSTICE: KESHO SCOTT

1953 births
Living people
American sociologists
American women sociologists
Grinnell College faculty
American Book Award winners
21st-century American women